Motorola Hint QA30 is a sliding mobile camera phone introduced by Motorola in the fourth quarter of 2008. It was available on Alltel, Bell Canada, Cricket, MetroPCS, and US Cellular. It is no longer supported by carriers due to relying on the outdated CDMA. About the size of a post-it note, the QA30 slides open to reveal a full QWERTY keyboard for text messaging and email. The 2 megapixel camera stores 1600x1200 resolution pictures on either the 128 MB internal memory or on a MicroSD card up to 8 GB.

Features
One of the most immediate features of the front of the QA30 is the large 2.5" full color screen. The front has few buttons including a "Call" and "End" button, Media Player button, Back button and Menu navigation buttons. The Keypad Lock button is located on the top of the unit. Sliding the unit open reveals a full QWERTY Keyboard, and various shortcut buttons for features such as the camera, speakerphone, web browser, email, etc. 

The camera is capable of capturing 2-megapixel JPEG still images and MPEG-4 Video. The phone is also capable of alerting the user by announcing the name of the person calling if the contact's number has been previously entered in the units contact list. It comes with 31 pre-installed ring tones and has the capability of purchasing/downloading more ring tones from the internet. It also includes a built in MP3 Player.

The Motorola Hint is also capable of voice dialing and integrated speakerphone.

Notes and references

Reviews
http://reviews.cnet.com/cell-phones/motorola-hint-qa30-cricket/4505-6454_7-33660851.html

Hint Qa30